Larry Patrick Lee (born December 12, 1959) is an American college baseball coach, currently serving as the head coach of the Cal Poly Mustangs baseball team.  He began this job prior to the 2003 season.

Playing career
After graduating from San Luis Obispo High School in 1979, Lee played at two junior colleges, Santa Barbara City College in 1980 and Orange Coast College and 1981, before using his final two years of eligibility at Pepperdine. He then played briefly as a professional, appearing with the Class-A Utica Blue Sox in 1983.

Coaching career
Lee coached for sixteen years at Cuesta College, a community college in San Luis Obispo, California. He was named head coach at Cal Poly, also in San Luis Obispo, to replace Ritch Price, the school's first Division I coach, with the official announcement of his introduction taking place on July 22, 2002.

Lee built on Price's success with the Mustangs, earning the school's first invitation to the NCAA Tournament in 2009. As of 2023, he has coached 13 All-Americans and 79 players who would later sign professional contracts.

Personal life
Lee and his wife, Liz, have a son and a daughter together. Their son, Brooks, played on the Cal Poly baseball team and was a first-round selection in the 2022 Major League Baseball draft.

Head coaching record

CCCAA
The table below shows Lee's record as a junior college head coach.

NCAA
The table below shows Lee's record as a head coach at the NCAA Division I level.

See also
List of current NCAA Division I baseball coaches

References

1961 births
Living people
Cal Poly Mustangs baseball coaches
Santa Barbara City Vaqueros baseball coaches
Orange Coast Pirates baseball players
Pepperdine Waves baseball players
Santa Barbara City Vaqueros baseball players
Utica Blue Sox players
People from San Luis Obispo, California
Baseball players from California
Orange Coast Pirates baseball coaches
Baseball coaches from California